Pleurothallis ruscifolia is a species of orchid plant native to 600 – 2400 m.; Andes Mountains in South America, and Central America.

References 

ruscifolia
Flora of Belize
Flora of Bolivia
Flora of Brazil
Flora of Colombia
Flora of Costa Rica
Flora of Cuba
Flora of the Dominican Republic
Flora of Ecuador
Flora of El Salvador
Flora of French Guiana
Flora of Guatemala
Flora of Guyana
Flora of Jamaica
Flora of the Leeward Islands
Flora of Mexico
Flora of Nicaragua
Flora of Panama
Flora of Peru
Flora of Puerto Rico
Flora of Suriname
Flora of Trinidad and Tobago
Flora of Venezuela
Flora of the Windward Islands
Flora without expected TNC conservation status